Theodora (Italian:Teodora) is a 1914 Italian silent historical film directed by Roberto Roberti and starring Bice Valerian.

Cast
 Bice Valerian as Teodora  
 Giovanni Pezzinga
 Roberto Roberti

References

Bibliography
 Abel, Richard. Encyclopedia of Early Cinema. Taylor & Francis, 2005.

External links

1914 films
1910s Italian-language films
Films directed by Roberto Roberti
Italian silent short films
Italian historical films
1910s historical films
Italian black-and-white films